Poecilosoma eone is a moth in the subfamily Arctiinae. It was described by Jacob Hübner in 1827. It is found in the Amazon region.

References

Moths described in 1827
Arctiinae